Mikkel Dobloug (23 December 1844 – 18 October 1913) was a Norwegian merchant, wholesaler, philanthropist, and politician.

Biography
Mikkel Mikkelsen Dobloug was born at Vang in Hedmark, Norway.  He was the son of farmer Mikkel Dobloug (1799–1844) and Anne Ry (1806-1879).  He was the youngest of eight siblings and born after his father's death. In 1870, he founded the company Brødrene Dobloug in Christiania, along with his brother Jens Dobloug (1837-1891). After a few years,  Jens left the business due to personal illness. The mercantile trade grew rapidly and became a nationwide enterprise. Alongside the retail sector,  Dobloug was also established as a wholesaler.

He was a local politician for the Liberal Party. He was among the founders of the Free-minded Liberal Party in 1909.  Together with newspaper editor Ola Thommessen, he contributed to the foundation of the newspaper Tidens Tegn. The neighborhood of  Doblougløkken and the street Mikkel Doblougs gate in the Oslo district of  St. Hanshaugen were both named in his honor.

Personal life
He was married in 1878 to Susanna Nilsdatter Baashuus (1851-1931), daughter of farmer Nils Baashus (b. 1814) and Berthe Marie Roseth (b. 1816). They were the parents of five children. In 1912, they established the charitable foundation Svanhild og Sigrun Doblougs legat for oppdragelse af pigebørn in memory of two of his daughters. Their daughter, Anne Thommessen (1880-1968) was married to newspaper editor Rolf Thommessen. Their son Birger Dobloug (1881-1944) was a businessman and philanthropist for whom the Dobloug Prize (Doblougprisen) was named. Their son Ingar Dobloug  (1888-1976) took over the Brødrene Dobloug firm after the death of his father. Dobloug closed its doors in 1986 after 116 years of operation.

References

1844 births
1913 deaths
People from Hedmark
Norwegian company founders
Norwegian merchants
Norwegian business executives
Norwegian philanthropists
Liberal Party (Norway) politicians
Hedmark politicians
19th-century Norwegian businesspeople
19th-century philanthropists